Takchura (Taqsura) is a rural locality (a selo) in Tanovsky Selsoviet, Blagovarsky District, Bashkortostan, Russia. The population was 173 as of 2010. There is 1 street.

Geography 
Takchura is located 29 km northwest of Yazykovo (the district's administrative centre) by road. Tyuryushtamak is the nearest rural locality.

References 

Rural localities in Blagovarsky District